Alyssa Michelle Nakken (born June 13, 1990) is an American professional baseball coach for the San Francisco Giants of Major League Baseball (MLB). She is the first full-time female coach in MLB history, and the first to coach on the field during a major league game. She attended California State University, Sacramento, where she played college softball.

Early life
Nakken is from Woodland, California, and graduated from Woodland High School in 2008. In high school, Nakken played softball, basketball, and volleyball.

She attended California State University, Sacramento, where she played college softball for the Sacramento State Hornets as a first baseman. She had a .304 batting average and was named to the All-Pacific Coast Softball Conference all four years, from 2009 through 2012. She was also a three-time all conference selection, and the 2012 conference Scholar-Athlete of the Year. Nakken graduated with a bachelor's degree in psychology.

Career
Nakken joined the San Francisco Giants' baseball operations department as an intern in 2014. She worked for the team on health and wellness programs. In 2015, she earned a master's degree in sports management from the University of San Francisco, where she also worked as the chief information officer for the baseball team. The Giants promoted her to the major league coaching staff as an assistant coach in January 2020, making her the first full-time female coach in MLB history.

On July 20, 2020, Nakken became the first woman to coach on the field in a major league baseball game, during exhibition play. Nakken was first base coach for the Giants' game against the Oakland Athletics. The Giants won 6–2. Her jersey from the game was sent to the National Baseball Hall of Fame and Museum. Nakken continued to coach in exhibition games in 2021.

Nakken became the first woman to coach on the field in a regular season major league game on April 12, 2022, when the Giants substituted her into the game as the first base coach after Antoan Richardson was ejected during the top of the third inning of a game against the San Diego Padres.

Personal life
Nakken is married to Robert Abel, who is also a baseball coach at a baseball school that he founded in 2019.

See also

 List of Sacramento State people
 List of University of San Francisco people
 Women in baseball

References

Living people
1990 births
People from Woodland, California
Sacramento State Hornets softball players
San Francisco Giants coaches
San Francisco Giants executives
University of San Francisco alumni
Softball players from California
Major League Baseball first base coaches